The 1911 Grand National was the 73rd official annual renewal of the Grand National horse race that took place at Aintree Racecourse near Liverpool, England, on 24 March 1911.

The only moving images of the race turned up in a London auction in 2007, found by Angus Loughran, and first shown to the public in a BBC documentary "THE BIG FLUTTER: THE GRAND NATIONAL ON FILM" in 2011.

Torrential rain caused many riders to fall. Twenty two out of the twenty six runners failed to finish.

The race was won by the 20:1 shot Glenside, a broken winded one eyed horse, ridden by  Jack Anthony. He went into the lead after Caubeen and Rathnally collided after Becher's Brook, as the only horse that wasn't remounted, and went on to a twenty length victory. He was followed by Rathnally, Shady Girl and in fourth place Fool-Hardy, the only horses to finish the race.

Finishing Order

Non-finishers

References

https://web.archive.org/web/20060116221716/http://www.grand-national-world.co.uk/gnw/the_race/past_winners_index.html
http://news.bbc.co.uk/sport1/hi/other_sports/horse_racing/9450571.stm
https://web.archive.org/web/20131227085539/https://www.sportsbookguardian.com/horse-racing/grand-national/winners

 1911
Grand National
Grand National
20th century in Lancashire